Scoparia caesia is a moth of the family Crambidae. It is endemic to New Zealand.

Taxonomy
It was described by Alfred Philpott in 1926 as Orocrambus caesius. In 1975 David E. Gaskin excluded this species from the genus Orocambus and tentatively placed it within the genus Scoparia. However this placement is in doubt. As a result, this species has also been referred to as Scoparia (s.l.) caesia.

Description
The wingspan is 25–27 mm. The forewings are fuscous-black, irrorated with white. There is an obscure blackish basal line and the first line is whitish, margined with blackish posteriorly. The second line is whitish, margined by blackish anteriorly. The hindwings are shining fuscous. Adults have been recorded on wing in January.

References

Moths described in 1926
Moths of New Zealand
Scorparia
Endemic fauna of New Zealand
Endemic moths of New Zealand